Thank You (Russian: Спасибо / Spasibo) is the fifth album by Zemfira. It was released in October 2007 with the participation of "Kommersant'" magazine. The album has sold about 350, 000 copies in Russia. It is 42 minutes and 59 seconds long.

Playlist 

 "В метро / In The Metro / V metro" – 0
 "Воскресенье / Sunday / Voskresen'e" – 0
 "Дом / House / Dom" – 0
 "Мы разбиваемся / We Break / My razbivaemsya" – 0
 "Мальчик / Boy / Mal'chik" – 0
 "Господа / Gentlemen / Gospoda" – 0
 "Я полюбила вас / I Have Fallen In Love With You / Ya polyubila vas" – 0
 "Возьми меня / Take Me / Voz'mi menya" – 0
 "Снег начнется / When It Snows / Sneg nachnetsya" – '!'0 "1000 лет / 1000 Years / Tysyacha let" – 0 "Во мне / In Me / Vo mne" – 0 "Спасибо (Репетиция, ноябрь 2006) / Thank You (Rehearsal, November 2006) / Spasibo (Repetitsiya, noyabr' 2006)" – 0''

2015 albums
Zemfira albums